Red Hill Church and School is a historic church and school located on Durham Road at Ottsville, Tinicum Township, Bucks County, Pennsylvania. The church was built in 1766, and is a two bay by two bay, stuccoed stone building with a gable roof.  The one-room school building was built in 1843, and is a one-story, three bay by one bay, stuccoed stone building.  It has a gable roof with cupola.  The church was built by a Presbyterian congregation, who sold it to a Lutheran and Reformed Church congregation in 1843.  It remain in use as a church until 1920, then re-occupied in the summer of 1959.  The school was use for public education until 1958, after which it was used for community meetings.

It was added to the National Register of Historic Places in 1978.

References

Cemeteries in Bucks County, Pennsylvania
One-room schoolhouses in Pennsylvania
Churches on the National Register of Historic Places in Pennsylvania
Religious buildings and structures completed in 1766
School buildings completed in 1843
Churches in Bucks County, Pennsylvania
Schools in Bucks County, Pennsylvania
1766 establishments in the Thirteen Colonies
18th-century churches in the United States
National Register of Historic Places in Bucks County, Pennsylvania